Igor Alborov (Игорь Алборов; born November 30, 1982) is a boxer from Uzbekistan, who participated in the 2004 Summer Olympics for his native Asian country. There he was stopped in the round of sixteen of the Heavyweight (91 kg) division by Egypt's eventual bronze medal winner Mohamed Elsayed.

Alborov qualified for the 2004 Athens Games by ending up in first place at the 1st AIBA Asian 2004 Olympic Qualifying Tournament in Guangzhou, China. In the decisive final match he defeated Kazakhstan's Pavel Storozhuk.

References
Profile

1982 births
Olympic boxers of Uzbekistan
Living people
Boxers at the 2004 Summer Olympics
Uzbekistani male boxers
Heavyweight boxers
21st-century Uzbekistani people